Bad Channels is the soundtrack album of the science fiction spoof film of the same name, released in 1992. It features ten songs by the bands Blue Öyster Cult, Joker, Fair Game (with Ron Keel), Sykotik Sinfoney and DMT and a film score written and performed by Blue Öyster Cult.

Track listing

Personnel
Blue Öyster Cult 
Eric Bloom – vocals, guitar, keyboards
Donald 'Buck Dharma' Roeser – lead guitar, vocals, keyboards
Allen Lanier – guitar, keyboards
Jon Rogers – bass, background vocals
Chuck Burgi – drums, background vocals

Additional notes
Catalogue: (CD) Moonstone 12936

References

Blue Öyster Cult albums
1992 soundtrack albums
Science fiction film soundtracks